The 2011 NCAA Division I women's soccer tournament (also known as the 2011 Women's College Cup) was the 30th annual single-elimination tournament to determine the national champion of NCAA Division I women's collegiate soccer. The semifinals and championship game were played at Kennesaw State University Soccer Stadium (now known as Fifth Third Bank Stadium) in Kennesaw, Georgia from December 2–4, 2011 while the preceding rounds were played at various sites across the country from November 11–27. 

Stanford defeated Duke in the final, 1–0, to win their first national title. Stanford had lost the final match of the previous two Women's College Cup tournaments. The undefeated Cardinal (25–0–1) were coached by Paul Ratcliffe. They were the first team to finish the season without a loss since North Carolina in 2003.

The most outstanding offensive player was Teresa Noyola from Stanford, and the most outstanding defensive player was Emily Oliver, also from Stanford. Noyola and Oliver, alongside nine other players, were named to the All-Tournament team. 

The tournament's leading scorer, with 5 goals and 3 assists, was Katie Stengel from Wake Forest.

Qualification

All Division I women's soccer programs were eligible to qualify for the tournament. The tournament field remained fixed at 64 teams.

Format
Just as before, the final two rounds, deemed the Women's College Cup, were played at a pre-determined neutral site. All other rounds were played on campus sites at the home field of the higher-seeded team although with a few exceptions. The first round was played exclusively on the home fields of higher-seeded teams (noted with an asterisk below). However, the second and third rounds were played on the home fields of the home fields of the two remaining teams in each bracket with the highest seed (generally the #1 and #2 seed in each bracket with a few noted exceptions). Those teams are also noted with asterisk. Finally, the quarterfinal round, or the championship match for each bracket, was played on the home field of the higher-seeded team, with no exceptions.

National seeds

Teams

Bracket

Stanford Bracket

Florida State Bracket

Wake Forest Bracket

Duke Bracket

College Cup

All-tournament team
 Teresa Noyola, Stanford (most outstanding offensive player)
Emily Oliver, Stanford (most outstanding defensive player)
Alina Garciamendez, Stanford
Tori Huster, Florida State
Kaitlyn Kerr, Duke
Camille Levin, Stanford
Nicole Lipp, Duke
Kristen Meier, Wake Forest
Mollie Pathman, Duke
Chioma Ubogagu, Stanford
Kristy Zermuhlen, Stanford

See also 
 NCAA Women's Soccer Championships (Division II, Division III)
 NCAA Men's Soccer Championships (Division I, Division II, Division III)

References

NCAA
NCAA Women's Soccer Championship
NCAA Division I Women's Soccer Tournament
NCAA Division I Women's Soccer Tournament
NCAA Division I Women's Soccer Tournament
 
Soccer in Georgia (U.S. state)